Local elections were held in the province of Bukidnon on May 13, 2013 as part of the 2013 general election.  Voters will select candidates for all local positions: a town mayor, vice mayor and town councilors, as well as members of the Sangguniang Panlalawigan, the vice-governor, governor and representatives for the four districts of Bukidnon.

Provincial Elections
The candidates for governor and vice governor with the highest number of votes wins the seat; they are voted separately, therefore, they may be of different parties when elected.

Candidates for Governor
Parties are as stated in their certificate of candidacies.

Incumbent Gov.Alex Calingasan is running for Vice Governor. former Gov.Jose Maria Zubiri, Jr. is his party's nominee.

Candidates for Vice-Governor
Parties are as stated in their certificate of candidacies.

Incumbent Vice Governor Jose Maria Zubiri, Jr. is running for Governor. Incumbent Gov.Alex Calingasan is his party's nominee.

Congressional Election
Bukidnon was redistricted into four districts after the candidacies were submitted. As a result, the Commission on Elections (Philippines) will take into account the places where the nominees are registered to determine on what district they are running under.

1st District
Jesus Emmanuel Paras is the incumbent.

2nd District
Incumbent Florencio Flores is running unopposed.

3rd District
Incumbent from the predistricted third district Jose Ma. Zubiri III found himself running at the redistricted 3rd district. His Bukidnon Paglaum party is in an electoral alliance with the Liberal Party.

4th District
The seat for the redistricted 4th District is open.

Sangguniang Panlalawigan Elections
All 4 Districts of Bukidnon will elect Sangguniang Panlalawigan or provincial board members.

1st District

|-

|-

2nd District

|-

|-

3rd District

|-

|-

4th District

|-

|-

City and Municipal Elections
All cities and municipalities of Bukidnon will elect mayor and vice-mayor this election. The candidates for mayor and vice mayor with the highest number of votes wins the seat; they are voted separately, therefore, they may be of different parties when elected. Below is the list of mayoralty candidates of each city and municipalities per district.

1st District
Municipality: Baungon, Libona, Malitbog, Manolo Fortich, Sumilao, Talakag

Baungon
Pedro Alvarez is the incumbent.

Libona
Incumbent Totom Calingasan is running unopposed.

Malitbog
Mayor Aida dela Rosa is no longer seeking reelection but her husband, former mayor Munding Dela Rosa is vying for the seat again.

Manolo Fortich
Incumbent Rogelio Quiño is running unopposed.

Sumilao
Rey Baula is the incumbent. he is challenge by councilor Dante Cuevas

Talakag
Nestor Macapayag is the incumbent. Vice Mayor Renato Sulatan is his main opponent.

2nd District
City: Malaybalay City
Municipality: Cabanglasan, Impasugong, Lantapan, San Fernando

Malaybalay City
Ignacio Zubiri is the incumbent. Vice Mayor Victor Aldeguer is his main opponent.

Cabanglasan
Rogelio Castillanes is the incumbent.

Impasugong
Mario Okinlay is the incumbent. he is challenge by Former Bukidnon Second Electric Cooperative board member Oliver Aldovino.

Lantapan
Godofredo Balansag is the incumbent.

San Fernando
Incumbent Laurencia Edma is no longer running. his husband Vice Mayor Levi Edma, Sr. is her party's nominee.

3rd District
Municipality: Damulog, Dangcagan, Don Carlos, Kadingilan, Kibawe, Kitaotao, Maramag, Quezon

Damulog
Romy Tiongco is the incumbent.

Dangcagan
Incumbent Edilberto Ayuban is term-limited and running for vice mayor instead. Vice Mayor Dodong Dandasan is his party's nominee.

Don Carlos
Felix Manzano is the incumbent.

Kadingilan
Joelito Talaid is the incumbent.

Kibawe
Minerva Casinabe is the incumbent. she is oppose by Coun.Rodulfo Jurado.

Kitaotao
Incumbent Rodito Rafisura is term-limited. his party nominate Vice Mayor Tata Gawilan.

Maramag
Alicia Resus is the incumbent.

Quezon
Gregorio Gue is the incumbent. he will challenge by John John Fortich who is member of Fortich clan who ruled Bukidnon for several decades.

4th District
City: Valencia City
Municipality: Kalilangan, Pangantucan

Valencia City
Leandro Jose Catarata is the incumbent. he is oppose by his political rival Jose Galario, Jr. and 2 city councilors Arlyn Ayon and Baby Mabao.

Kalilangan
Incumbent Nenita Suyao is term-limited and running for Provincial Board Member instead. her party nominate Raymon Charl Gamboa.

Pangantucan
Incumbent Manolito Garces is running unopposed.

2013 Philippine local elections
Elections in Bukidnon